Liv On is a collaborative album created by Olivia Newton-John, Beth Nielsen Chapman and Amy Sky. The goal behind the album was to "create songs with a message of compassion and hope. They are for anyone facing a time of challenge in their life, whether it is grieving a loss – or on the journey to health and recovery." The album debuted at number 72 in Australia.

Track listing
All tracks composed by Amy Sky, Beth Nielsen Chapman and Olivia Newton-John; except where indicated.
 "My Heart Goes Out to You" – 2:45
Lead vocals by Amy Sky, Beth Nielsen Chapman and Olivia Newton-John
 "Live On" – 4:11
Lead vocals by Olivia Newton-John
 "Stone in My Pocket" – 3:22
Lead vocals by Amy Sky, Beth Nielsen Chapman and Olivia Newton-John
 "Sand and Water" (Beth Nielsen Chapman) – 4:28
Lead vocals by Beth Nielsen Chapman
 "Forever Blue" (Amy Sky) – 4:48
Lead vocals by Amy Sky
 "Immortality" (Lyrics by Mary Elizabeth Frye; written by Amy Sky, Beth Nielsen Chapman, Olivia Newton-John) – 3:24
Lead vocals by Amy Sky, Beth Nielsen Chapman and Olivia Newton-John
 "Don't Know What to Say" – 3:27
Lead vocals by Beth Nielsen Chapman
 "Impossible" (Beth Nielsen Chapman, Laureen Smith) – 3:27
Lead vocals by Olivia Newton-John
 "I Will Take Care of You" (Amy Sky, David Pickell) – 4:58
Lead vocals by Amy Sky
 "Grace and Gratitude" (Amy Sky, Olivia Newton-John) – 3:58
Lead vocals by Olivia Newton-John
 "There's Still My Joy" (Beth Nielsen Chapman, Matt Rollings, Melissa Manchester) – 3:10
Lead vocals by Olivia Newton-John

Personnel

Musicians
 Dane Bryant – keyboards, acoustic piano 
 Kirby Shelstad – additional keyboards 
 Amy Sky – acoustic piano (5, 6)
 Austin Hoke – accordion, cello (1, 11)
 Beth Nielsen Chapman – acoustic guitar 
 Kerry Marx – acoustic guitar, electric guitars 
 Michael Thompson – acoustic guitar (2), electric guitars (2)
 Dan Dugmore – pedal steel guitar
 Matthew McKenzie – bass (1-5, 7-11)
 Maartin Allcock – bass (6)
 Mark Beckett – drums, percussion 
 John Ragusa – flute, penny whistle
 Hattie Webb – harp
 Ezra Jordan, Marc Jordan, Liisi Lafontaine, Kenna Ramsey and Nita Whitaker – choir (2)

Arrangements
 Beth Nielsen Chapman – vocal arrangements (1-4, 6-9, 11)
 Olivia Newton-John – vocal arrangements (1, 4, 6-10)
 Amy Sky – vocal arrangements (1, 4-10), cello arrangements (1, 11), choir arrangements (2)
 Marc Jordan – choir arrangements (2)
 Dane Bryant – string arrangements (5)

Production
 Beth Nielsen Chapman – producer, additional engineer 
 Olivia Newton-John – producer 
 Amy Sky – producer 
 Bob Katz – tracking 
 Kevin Luu – tracking assistant 
 Maartin Allcock – additional engineer 
 John "Beetle" Bailey – additional engineer, mixing
 Robert Irving – additional engineer, assistant engineer 
 Taylor Kernohan – additional engineer, assistant engineer 
 David Leonard – additional engineer 
 Shelly McErlaine – additional engineer
 John Rausch – additional engineer
 Kirby Shelstad – additional engineer 
 Michael Thompson – additional engineer
 Peter Letros – mastering 
 Michael Caprio – cover design, artwork
 Denise Truscello – photography
 Elena Petroiu – hair stylist

Charts

Release history

References

2016 albums
Olivia Newton-John albums
Collaborative albums
Sony Music Australia albums